Anna Pohludková (born 26 August 1959) is a Czech former gymnast. She competed for Czechoslovakia in six events at the 1976 Summer Olympics.

References

External links
 
 

1959 births
Living people
Czech female artistic gymnasts
Olympic gymnasts of Czechoslovakia
Gymnasts at the 1976 Summer Olympics
People from Frýdek-Místek District
Sportspeople from the Moravian-Silesian Region